Thailand participated and hosted the  2009 Asian Martial Arts Games held in the capital city of  Bangkok from August 1, 2009 to August 9, 2009. 
As host nation, Thailand finished with a total of 21 gold medals, 17 silver medals, and 16 bronze medals  to secure its top spot in the medal tally.

2009 in Thai sport
Thailand at the Asian Indoor Games